Cepstral is a provider of speech synthesis technology and services. It was founded in June 2000 by scientists from Carnegie Mellon University including the computer scientists Kevin Lenzo and Alan W. Black. It is a privately held corporation with headquarters in Pittsburgh, Pennsylvania.

The company primarily produces synthetic voices to be used in telephony systems, mobile applications, desktop applications, and with other TTS software such as open-source Festival.

See also
 Cepstrum
 Kevin Lenzo
 Alan W. Black
 Speech synthesis

References

External links
 The Cepstral website

Software companies based in Pennsylvania
Software companies of the United States